White as Snow may refer to the following:

"White as Snow" (Captain Scarlet), an episode of Captain Scarlet and the Mysterons
White as Snow (film), a 2010 Turkish film
White As Snow, a novel by Tanith Lee
White As Snow, a song by Christian group Maranatha! Singers based on Isaiah 1:18
"White as Snow", a song by U2
white as snow, the color white comparable to snow

See also
 Snow White (disambiguation)
 As White as in Snow, 2001 Swedish film